Taipei Medical University Hospital (TMUH) is a healthcare facility in Taipei, Taiwan established in 1976.

Reproductive Center－In Vitro Fertilization (IVF) 
The Center for Reproductive Medicine at Taipei Medical University Hospital was established in 1991. It is headed by Professor Tzeng Chii-Ruey. With advanced reproductive technology, more than 20,000 infertile couples have been conceived. In 1991, the first test-tube baby of the hospital was born. In 1993, the center successfully applied the first case of microsurgical epididymal sperm aspiration in the country. In 1995, the first baby using intracytoplasmic sperm injection was born in the hospital. In 1996, a frozen embryo was successfully induced pregnancy after being thawed.

In 2001, the center successfully performed autologous mitochondrial transfer.

Taipei Cancer Center
The Taipei Cancer Center was established in October 2020.

Health Management Center
Health management services available in center:

Health screening
Professional services
Medical equipment
Accommodation
Health examination services

See also 
 List of hospitals in Taiwan
 Taipei Medical University

References

1976 establishments in Taiwan
Hospitals established in 1976
Hospitals in Taipei
Taipei Medical University
Teaching hospitals in Taiwan